Chain Mail is a 2015 Filipino mystery horror film starring Meg Imperial, Shy Carlos and Nadine Lustre. It was released on July 22, 2015, by VIVA Films. It was directed and co-written by Adolfo Alix Jr.

The film earned negative reviews from film critics.

Synopsis
The movie follows a group of people who receive a chain letter. Some of them forward it along as it requested, but some just ignore it. Subsequent events suggest the letter is cursed, and results in people dying brutal and bloody deaths. Will the dark and black origins behind the cursed letter be unveiled before time runs out to stop the gruesome murders caused by the unknown evil itself?

Cast

Critical reception 
Chain Mail received negative reviews from film critics.

Philbert Ortiz from clickthecity.com gave a 2 and a half stars saying  " It isn't scary. It isn't affecting. It doesn't even make any sense. Its climax is a genuine mess, the film clearly trying to dig its way out of a bottomless narrative hole, leading to ridiculous sequences that make the characters look like complete morons. It doesn't feel like anyone really wanted to make this film, but it exists because of how the industry is run. It's all about showcasing young stars."

Oggs Cruz from rappler also gave a negative review from the film saying "On paper, Chain Mail is full of promise – but it doesn't really deliver."

See also 
 List of Filipino films in 2015
 List of ghost films

References

External links 
 

2015 films
Philippine mystery films
Philippine teen horror films
Techno-horror films
2015 horror films
Viva Films films
2010s Tagalog-language films
2010s English-language films
Films directed by Adolfo Alix Jr.